The 2007 Monza GP2 Series round was a GP2 Series motor race held on September 8 and 9, 2007 at the Autodromo Nazionale Monza in Monza, Italy. It was the ninenth round of the 2007 GP2 Series season. The race weekend supported the 2007 Italian Grand Prix.

Classification

Qualifying

Feature race

 Kazuki Nakajima finished 13th, but was disqualified from the race for causing a collision with Ho-Pin Tung.

Sprint race

 Giorgio Pantano finished 6th, but was disqualified from the race for ignoring the mechanical warning flag instructing him to pit for repairs.

References

Monza
GP2